Pseudacanthicus major is a species of catfish in the family Loricariidae. It is native to South America, where it occurs in the Tocantins River basin in Brazil. The species is notably large for a loricariid, reaching 60 cm (23.6 inches) SL.

P. major was described in 2018 by Carine C. Chamon (of the Federal University of Tocantins) and Thiago Costa e Silva on the basis of coloration and morphology. Its specific epithet derives from Latin and refers to its large size. It appears in the aquarium trade, where it is usually referred to either as the giant cactus pleco or by its L-number, which is L-186. FishBase does not list this species.

References 

Ancistrini
Fish described in 2018